Kim Min-ah (born February 1, 1991) is a South Korean television personality. She was JTBC's only weathercaster, hosting JTBC News Morning&'s weather segment from January 2016 to March 2020, and worked as an air stewardess for Asiana Airlines.

She signed with SM Culture & Contents on March 18, 2020.

Currently, she is starring in the KBS show 20th Century Hit Song.

Filmography

Television shows

References

South Korean television presenters
South Korean women television presenters
1991 births
People from Anyang, Gyeonggi
Living people
South Korean announcers
South Korean television personalities